Coenzyme M is a coenzyme required for methyl-transfer reactions in the metabolism of archaeal methanogens, and in the metabolism of other substrates in bacteria. It is also a necessary cofactor in the metabolic pathway of alkene-oxidizing bacteria. CoM helps eliminate the toxic epoxides formed from the oxidation of alkenes such as propylene. The structure of this coenzyme was discovered by CD Taylor and RS Wolfe in 1974 while they were studying methanogenesis, the process by which carbon dioxide is transformed into methane in some anaerobic bacteria. The coenzyme is an anion with the formula .  It is named 2-mercaptoethanesulfonate and abbreviated HS–CoM.  The cation is unimportant, but the sodium salt is most available.  Mercaptoethanesulfonate contains both a thiol, which is the main site of reactivity, and a sulfonate group, which confers solubility in aqueous media.

Biochemical role

Methanogenesis 
The coenzyme is the C1 donor in methanogenesis. It is converted to methyl-coenzyme M thioether, the thioether , in the penultimate step to methane formation. Methyl-coenzyme M reacts with coenzyme B, 7-thioheptanoylthreoninephosphate, to give a heterodisulfide, releasing methane:

 CH3–S–CoM + HS–CoB → CH4 + CoB–S–S–CoM

This induction is catalyzed by the enzyme methyl-coenzyme M reductase, which restricts cofactor F430 as the prosthetic group.

Alkene metabolism 
Coenzyme M is also used to make acetoacetate from CO2 and propylene or ethylene in aerobic bacteria. Specifically, in bacteria that oxidize alkenes into epoxides.  After the propylene (or other alkene) undergoes epoxidation and becomes epoxypropane it becomes electrophilic and toxic. These epoxides react with DNA  and proteins, affecting cell function. Alkene-oxidizing bacteria like Xanthobacter autotrophicus use a metabolic pathway in which CoM is conjugated with an aliphatic epoxide. This step creates a nucleophilic compound which can react with CO2. The eventual carboxylation produces acetoacetate, breaking down the propylene.

See also 
 Mesna – a cancer chemotherapy adjuvant with the same structure

References 

Coenzymes
Thiols
Sulfonates